The Thriae were nymphs, three virginal sisters, one of a number of such triads in Greek mythology. They were named Melaina ("The Black"), Kleodora ("Famed for her Gift"), and Daphnis ("Laurel") or Corycia.

Mythology 
They were the three Naiads (nymphs) of the sacred springs of the Corycian Cave of Mount Parnassus in Phocis, and the patrons of bees. The nymphs had women's heads and torsos and lower body and wings of a bee.

The nymph sisters were romantically linked to the gods Apollo and Poseidon; Corycia, the sister after whom the Corycian Cave was named, was the mother of Lycoreus with Apollo, Kleodora was loved by Poseidon, and was the mother by him (or Kleopompos) of Parnassos (who founded the city of Parnassus) while Melaina was also loved by Apollo, and bore him Delphos (although another tradition names Thyia as the mother of Delphos). Her name, meaning "the black," suggests that she presided over subterranean nymphs.

These three bee maidens with the power of divination and thus speaking truth are described in the Homeric Hymn to Hermes, and the food of the gods is "identified as honey"; the bee maidens were originally associated with Apollo, and are probably not correctly identified with the Thriae. Both the Thriae and the Bee Maidens are credited with assisting Apollo in developing his adult powers, but the divination that Apollo learned from the Thriae differs from that of the Bee Maidens. The type of divination taught by the Thriae to Apollo was that of mantic pebbles, the throwing of stones, rather than the type of divination associated with the Bee Maidens and Hermes: cleromancy, the casting of lots. 
Honey, according to a Greek myth, was discovered by a nymph called Melissa ("Bee"); and honey was offered to the Greek gods from Mycenean times. Bees were associated, too, with the Delphic oracle and the prophetess was sometimes called a bee.

Notes

References 
 Evelyn-White, Hugh, The Homeric Hymns and Homerica with an English Translation by Hugh G. Evelyn-White. Homeric Hymns. Cambridge, Massachusetts, Harvard University Press; London, William Heinemann Ltd. 1914.
 Pausanias, Pausanias Description of Greece with an English Translation by W.H.S. Jones, Litt.D., and H.A. Ormerod, M.A., in 4 Volumes. Cambridge, MA, Harvard University Press; London, William Heinemann Ltd. 1918. Online version at the Perseus Digital Library.
 Hyginus, Gaius Julius, The Myths of Hyginus. Edited and translated by Mary A. Grant, Lawrence: University of Kansas Press, 1960.
 Scheinberg, Susan 1979. "The Bee Maidens of the Homeric Hymn to Hermes" Harvard Studies in Classical Philology 83 (1979), pp.1–28.
 Larson, Jennifer. “The Corycian Nymphs and the Bee Maidens of the Homeric Hymn to Hermes.”  Greek, Roman and Byzantine Studies, (1996): 341-357.

External links 
 THRIAI on The Theoi Project

 
Nymphs
Women of Apollo
Women of Poseidon
Classical oracles
Mythological Greek seers
Oracular goddesses